Heriot, from Old English heregeat ("war-gear"), was originally a death-duty in late Anglo-Saxon England, which required that at death, a nobleman provided to his king a given set of military equipment, often including horses, swords, shields, spears and helmets. It later developed into a kind of tenurial feudal relief due from villeins. The equivalent term in French was droit du meilleur catel.

Etymology
The word derives from Old English here-geatwa, meaning the arms and equipment (geatwa) of a soldier or army (here).

History
Heriot was the right of a lord in feudal Europe to seize a serf's best horse, clothing, or both, upon his death. It arose from the tradition of the lord lending a serf a horse or armour or weapons to fight so that when the serf died the lord would rightfully reclaim his property. Payments of heriot are sometimes mentioned in the wills of West-Saxon nobles from the mid-tenth century onward (a case in question is that of Æthelmær). The regulation of levels of heriot is the subject of a clause in Cnut's secular law-code (II Cnut § 71), drawn up between 1020 and 1023. The form of this duty depended on the rank of the nobleman (earl, king's thegn, median thegn) and on his region (Danelaw, Wessex). 

When knights as a class emerged and were later able to acquire their own fighting instruments, the lord continued to claim rights to property upon death, extending sometimes to everyone not just the fighting knights. Serfs could make provisions for heriot in their wills, but death in battle often meant no heriot was required, because the winner of a fight would often take horse and armour anyway as was often the custom. By the 13th century the payment was made either in money or in kind by handing over the best beast or chattel of the tenant. The enlightened cleric Jacques de Vitry called lords who imposed heriots "vultures that prey upon death... worms feeding upon the corpse." 

Heriot came in many varieties. G. G. Coulton reports a curious case of heriot in modern times: 

Heriot is one of the many curious laws from feudal times that started because of a logical need between two parties, and persisted because a lord's customary rights tended to continue on even when their original reason no longer existed. This law and many others, such as the noble right not to pay taxes, have a long and contentious history in Europe. It was legally abolished in Britain in 1922.

See also
Copyhold (the manorial law relating to heriot).
Anglo-Saxon weaponry

References

Abels, Richard. Lordship and Military Obligation in Anglo-Saxon England. London, 1988. 
Abels, Richard. "Heriot." The Blackwell Encyclopedia of Anglo-Saxon England, ed. Michael Lapidge et al. Oxford: Blackwell: 1999. 235–6.

Stafford, Pauline. "King and kin, Lord and Community." In Gender, Family and the Legitimation of Power.

External links
Canute, King of the English: On Heriots and Reliefs, c. 1016-1035

Feudalism in England
Serfdom